Steven George (born 5 June 1982)   is an Australian Paralympic tandem cycling pilot, who piloted Bryce Lindores at the 2008 Beijing Paralympics.  He won a bronze medal at the games in the Men's Individual Pursuit B VI 1–3 event, with the pair beating their personal best time by six seconds.

References

1982 births
Paralympic cyclists of Australia
Cyclists at the 2008 Summer Paralympics
Paralympic bronze medalists for Australia
Paralympic sighted guides
Living people
Medalists at the 2008 Summer Paralympics
Australian male cyclists
Paralympic medalists in cycling